Donald Kirke (1901–1971) was an American stage, film and television actor.

Career
In the early 1920s, Kirke acted in stock theater, including the Gene Lewis-Olga Worth and the Lewis-Worth companies.

Kirke's Broadway credits include The Constant Sinner (1931), A Woman Denied (1931), The Old Rascal (1930), Remote Control (1929), and Gang War (1928).

On December 18, 1922, Kirke signed a contract with the Christie Film Company, for which he had worked two years before going into stock theater.

Kirke ventured into vaudeville in August 1923. He left the Keith's State Stock Company to be in the drama The Song of India, which was opening in Harrisburg, Pennsylvania.

Filmography

References

Bibliography
 Vogel, Michelle. Marjorie Main: The Life and Films of Hollywood's "Ma Kettle. McFarland, 2011.

External links

1901 births
1971 deaths
American male television actors
American male film actors
Male actors from Jersey City, New Jersey
20th-century American male actors